Godfrey Mwamba (born 26 March 1950) is a Zambian boxer. He competed in the men's bantamweight event at the 1968 Summer Olympics.

References

1950 births
Living people
Zambian male boxers
Olympic boxers of Zambia
Boxers at the 1968 Summer Olympics
People from Kitwe
Bantamweight boxers